Herning Municipality is a municipality (Danish, kommune) in Region Midtjylland on the Jutland peninsula in western Denmark. Its mayor is Dorte West, a member of the Venstre (Liberal Party) political party.

The main town and the site of its municipal council is the Town of Herning.

History
On January 1, 2007, as the result of Kommunalreformen ("The Municipal Reform" of 2007), Herning municipality was merged with former Aulum-Haderup, Trehøje, and Aaskov municipalities to form the new Herning municipality.

Locations

The city of Herning 

The city of Herning has a population of 50,531 (1 January 2022). The town has grown rapidly in the 150 years: in 1840 the total population of the village of Herning was just 21.

Politics

Municipal council
Herning's municipal council consists of 31 members, elected every four years.

Below are the municipal councils elected since the Municipal Reform of 2007.

Notable people
Gudmund Hatt (1884–1960), archaeologist and cultural geographer

Twin towns – sister cities

Herning is twinned with:

 Arsuk, Greenland
 Countryside, Åland Islands, Finland
 Eiði, Faroe Islands
 Holmestrand, Norway
 Husby, Germany
 Kangasala, Finland
 Siglufjörður, Iceland
 Vänersborg, Sweden

References 

 Municipal statistics: NetBorger Kommunefakta, delivered from KMD aka Kommunedata (Municipal Data)
 Municipal mergers and neighbors: Eniro new municipalities map
 Searchable/printable municipal map: Krak mapsearch (outline of municipality visible but doesn't print out)

External links 

 Herning municipality's official website 
 Destination Herning tourism information

 
Municipalities of the Central Denmark Region
Municipalities of Denmark
Populated places established in 2007